Sonico is a comune in the province of Brescia, in Lombardy. It is situated on the left bank of the river Oglio, in Val Camonica. It is bounded by the communes of Berzo Demo, Cevo, Edolo, Malonno and Saviore dell'Adamello.

References

Cities and towns in Lombardy